In heraldry, a pile is a  charge usually counted as one of the  ordinaries (figures bounded by straight lines and occupying a definite portion of the shield). It consists of a wedge emerging from the upper edge of the shield and converging to a point near the base. If it touches the base, it is blazoned throughout.

Variant positions and varying numbers 
Though the pile issues from the top of the shield by default, it may be specified as issuing from any other part of the edge or as extending from edge to edge of the shield. Although it is not supposed to issue singly from the base, this rule is frequently ignored. 

When a shield has more than one pile, and they are angled so that they touch at the base, they are described as piles in point. A few heraldry authorities from the Middle Ages such as Sir Thomas Holme and Nicholas Upton believed that whenever piles issued from the chief, they should automatically meet in point, but this view eventually fell out of favour and it has become common practice that unless otherwise specified, they should be drawn perpendicularly. However, it is still possible to see examples of the previous school of thought.

Variant forms 
Like any  ordinary, a pile may have other charges on it, may have its edges ornamented by any of the  lines of variation, and may have any tincture or pattern.

Rare variants 
Occasionally piles have more than one point, appear in large numbers, have their points truncated or ornamented, have their edges ornamented, or are charged with other piles.

Other things 'in pile' or 'pilewise'
A collection of charges in a converging arrangement may be blazoned as pilewise or in pile.

Charge or division? 

The distinction between a pile and a field divided per chevron inverted, or between a pile inverted and a field per chevron, can be uncertain.

The coat shown here, for the Elsenburg College of Agriculture, was blazoned by the South African Bureau of Heraldry as Per pile embowed inverted throughout gules, vert and argent; dexter a single share plough and sinister a garb, or, in base an anchor azure, cabled gules; but it could as easily be blazoned as Per pale gules and vert; on a pile inverted embowed argent, between a plough and a garb Or, an anchor azure cabled gules.

References

Sources
Boutell's Heraldry (revised J P Brook-Little, Norroy and Ulster King of Arms). Frederick Warne, London and New York, 1983
Sir Thomas Innes of Learney, Lord Lyon King of Arms: Scots Heraldry (revised Malcolm R Innes of Edingight, Marchmont Herald). Johnston and Bacon, London and Edinburgh, 1978
Kevin Greaves: A Canadian Heraldic Primer. The Heraldry Society of Canada, Ottawa, 2000
A C Fox-Davies: A Complete Guide to Heraldry (revised by J P Brooke-Little, Richmond Herald). Thomas Nelson and Sons, London 1969
 Sir James Balfour Paul (Lord Lyon King of Arms): An Ordinary of Arms Contained in the Public Register of All Arms and Bearings in Scotland. Edinburgh: W. Green & Sons, 1903
David Reid of Robertland and Vivien Wilson : An Ordinary of Arms, volume 2 [1902-1973]. Lyon Office, Edinburgh 1977

External links

 Heraldry Society of Scotland: members' arms
 Heraldry Society of Scotland: civic heraldry
 The Public Register of Arms, Flags and Badges of Canada
 USA Institute of Heraldry
 The Royal Heraldry Society of Canada: Members' Roll of Arms
 Civic Heraldry of England and Wales
 Armoria Patriae: State Arms in South Africa
 South African Bureau of Heraldry database (via National Archives of South Africa)
 James Parker A Glossary of Terms Used in Heraldry (online version) Saitou, hard copy first published 1894

Heraldic ordinaries

fr:Liste de pièces héraldiques#Pile